Ramy Youssef (born 1991) is an American stand-up comedian, actor, writer, and director of Egyptian descent known for his role as Ramy Hassan on the Hulu comedy series Ramy (2019–present), for which he won a Golden Globe Award for Best Actor – Television Series Musical or Comedy and a Peabody Award in 2020. He was also nominated for two Primetime Emmy Awards: Outstanding Directing for a Comedy Series and Outstanding Lead Actor in a Comedy Series.

In 2021, he was nominated for another Golden Globe Award for Best Actor - Television Series Musical or Comedy.

Early life 
Youssef was born in the Queens borough of New York City, to Egyptian parents, and later raised in New Jersey. Ten years after emigrating from Egypt, his father became a manager at the Plaza Hotel in New York City. He grew up in a Muslim household, observing Islamic holidays, and is a practicing Muslim. Raised in Rutherford, New Jersey, Youssef attended Rutherford High School. He went on to study political science and economics at Rutgers University, Newark, but he left before graduating to enroll at William Esper Studio to focus on acting.

Career 
Youssef made his acting debut on the Nick at Nite sitcom See Dad Run in which he had a main role. During the run of the show, Youssef shadowed the writers' room, an experience Youssef would bring to his own show in 2019.
In 2017, Youssef appeared on The Late Show with Stephen Colbert where he performed his stand-up routine.

His television series Ramy debuted on Hulu on April 19, 2019, with 10 episodes. The show, in which Youssef plays the title character, tells the story of a millennial Muslim who is a first-generation American born to immigrant parents in the United States. Soon after its first season debuted, Hulu renewed it for a second season with an expected premiere date in 2020. He received a Golden Globe in January 2020 for this role, and was also nominated for two Primetime Emmy Awards, as both an actor and director.

In June 2019, Youssef starred in his first HBO stand-up comedy special, Ramy Youssef: Feelings.

Along with Mo Amer, Youssef is the co-creator of Mo, an American comedy-drama streaming television series that premiered on August 24, 2022 on Netflix. 

After the debut of Ramy, Youssef signed an overall television production deal with A24. As of December 2019, he has two shows in development, one for Apple TV+ and one for Netflix.

Filmography

Film

Television

Awards and nominations

References

External links
 

21st-century American male actors
21st-century American comedians
American male comedians
American male television actors
People from Queens, New York
American Muslims
Best Musical or Comedy Actor Golden Globe (television) winners
Comedians from New York City
Comedians from New Jersey
Living people
Male actors from New Jersey
Male actors from New York City
Muslim male comedians
People from Rutherford, New Jersey
Rutgers University alumni
Rutherford High School (New Jersey) alumni
American stand-up comedians 
American people of Egyptian descent
American television directors 
1991 births